The 1971 Indian general election polls in Tamil Nadu were held for 39 seats in the state. After winning in 1967, DMK supported the Congress party under Indira Gandhi, and the 25 DMK MPs, ensured her to stay in power as a minority government, from 1969 to 1971. This state was crucial for Indira Gandhi to hold, in order for her to stay in power.  The result was a victory for Indian National Congress (Indira) and its ally Dravida Munnetra Kazhagam winning 38 seats (with 5 seats going to the Left Front), while Opposition Congress and Swatantra Party could only win 1 seat.  DMK won every seat it contested except the seat contested by K. Kamarajar in Nagercoil.

Voting and results

Results by Alliance

List of Elected MPs

See also 
Elections in Tamil Nadu

Bibliography 
Volume I, 1971 Indian general election, 5th Lok Sabha
DMK on the Defensive Economic and Political Weekly, Vol. 6, No. 3/5, Annual Number (Jan., 1971), pp. 189–190 Published by: Economic and Political Weekly

Footnotes

External links
 Website of Election Commission of India
 CNN-IBN Lok Sabha Election History

Tamil Nadu
Indian general elections in Tamil Nadu
1970s in Tamil Nadu